Kiss Me Again  is a 1931 American Pre-Code musical operetta film filmed entirely in Technicolor. It was originally released in the United States as Toast of the Legion late in 1930, but was quickly withdrawn when Warner Bros. realized that the public had grown weary of musicals. The Warner Bros. believed that this attitude would only last for a few months, but, when the public proved obstinate, they reluctantly re-released the film early in 1931 after making a few cuts to the film.

Like the 1926 silent First National film Mademoiselle Modiste, Kiss Me Again is based on a popular 1905 operetta on Broadway, Mlle. Modiste, by Victor Herbert and Henry Martyn Blossom.

Plot
A French shopgirl (Bernice Claire) obeys her parents by leaving her lover to become an opera star.

Cast
 Bernice Claire as Mademoiselle Fifi
 Edward Everett Horton as Rene
 Walter Pidgeon as Paul de St. Cyr
 June Collyer as Marie
 Frank McHugh as Francois
 Claude Gillingwater as Count de St. Cyr
 Judith Vosselli as Mademoiselle Cecile
 Albert Gran as General de Villafranche

Music
When the film was re-released in 1931, most of Walter Pidgeon's songs were cut from the film. Only a small abbreviated version of one of his songs is heard on the existing print.

Songs
 Ah! But in Dreams So Fair
 Alas! To Part, How Great the Sorrow
 I Want What I Want When I Want It
 If I Were On the Stage
 Kiss Me Again
 The Mascot of the Troop
 Clothes Parade
 A Make Believe Ladies Man
 Pan Americana
 Ballet Medley
 Air de Ballet
 The Time, the Place and the Girl

Preservation
Only a black-and-white copy of the cut print released in 1931 in the United States seems to have survived. The complete film was released intact in countries outside the United States under the title of Toast of the Legion where a backlash against musicals never occurred. It is unknown whether a copy of this full version still exists.

See also
 List of early color feature films

References

External links
 
 Synopsis (to 1926 version), allmovie.com; accessed July 22, 2015. 
 
 
 

1931 films
1931 musical films
1930s color films
1930s English-language films
Films based on operettas
American films based on plays
Films based on adaptations
Films directed by William A. Seiter
First National Pictures films
American musical films
Early color films
1930s American films